Emil Boyson (4 September 1897  – 2 June 1979) was a Norwegian poet, writer, and translator.

Biography
Carl Emil Steen Boyson was born in Bergen, Norway.  His parents were Immanuel Boysen (1854–1921) and  Christine Steen (1869–1905). He grew up as a single child after his  siblings died in childbirth. His mother died when he was nine years old. His  father was a jurist who was stationed in various places: Bergen, Trondheim, Røros and finally in Kristiania. In 1906, his father was  appointed at  Uttrøndelag  in Trondheim. In 1913 the family moved to Kristiania (now Oslo). In 1917, he obtained  artium at Kristiana Cathedral School.  In 1923 he married Friedel Schatz (1897–1975).  They were married in Berlin where she was employed as an artist.  The couple frequently lived apart until 1963, when they established residence on Hans Nielsen Hauges gate in Oslo.

His actual debut was in 1920 under the pseudonym Karl Snemo, with publication of Åpning til regnbuen. Boyson formally debuted in 1927 with a prose book Sommertørst. He was primarily known for his poetry. His poetry was written in a modernistic style, with a language differing from everyday language, but often maintaining traditional form and stanza patterns.

Emil Boyson also completed an anthology with fellow author Asbjørn Aarnes (1923-2013).   Norsk poesi fra Henrik Wergeland til Nordahl Grieg. En antologi was published by Gyldendal in 1961. The anthology covered over a century of Norwegian literature  from the early writings of Henrik Wergeland who born during  1808 to the final works of  Nordahl Grieg  who died during 1943.  The chapters profiled the writings  of twenty-four Norwegian authors and included such literary greats is Bjornstjerne Bjornson, Sigrid Undset and Knut Hamsun.

Bibliography
Åpning til regnbuen – poetry (1920)
Sommertørst: En historie – novel (1927)
Skumring mellom søiler – poetry (1932)
Varsler og møter – poetry (1934)
Tegn og tydning – poetry (1935)
Yngre herre på besøk: En fabel – novel (1936)
Vandring mot havet: En prosa-diktning  – novel (1937)
Gjemt i mørket – poetry (1939)
Sjelen og udyret – poetry (1946)
Gjenkjennelse – dpoetry (1957)
Utvalgte dikt – collected poetry (1959)
70 dikt – collected poetry(1974)
Før sporene slettes: dagbok – poetry (1981) (illustrated by Kåre Tveter)

Prizes
Gyldendal's Endowment - 1946
Dobloug Prize - 1956
Critics Prize - 1957
Riksmålsforbundets litteraturpris - 1959
Gyldendal's Endowment - 1974

References

1897 births
1979 deaths
Writers from Bergen
People educated at Oslo Cathedral School
20th-century Norwegian male writers
20th-century Norwegian novelists
Norwegian Critics Prize for Literature winners
Dobloug Prize winners